The 1997 Internazionali di Tennis di San Marino was a men's tennis tournament played on outdoor clay courts in City of San Marino, San Marino that was part of the World Series of the 1997 ATP Tour. It was the ninth edition of the tournament and was held from 4 August until 10 August 1997. First-seeded Félix Mantilla won the singles titles.

Finals

Singles

 Félix Mantilla defeated  Magnus Gustafsson, 6–4, 6–1
 It was Mantilla's 4th singles title of the year and the 5th of his career..

Doubles

 Cristian Brandi /  Filippo Messori defeated  Brandon Coupe /  David Roditi, 7–5, 6–4

References

External links
 ITF tournament edition details

Campionati Internazionali di San Marino
San Marino CEPU Open
1997 in Sammarinese sport